The New Heritage Party, former Heritage Party, is a political party in Zambia.

History
The party was formed in 2001 by Godfrey Miyanda after he left the Movement for Multi-Party Democracy over President Frederick Chiluba's plans to run for a third term in office. In the December 2001 general elections Miyanda stood as the party's presidential candidate, finishing fifth in a field of eleven candidates with 8% of the vote. The party also received 8% of the vote in the National Assembly elections, winning four seats.

In the 2006 elections Miyanda was the party's presidential candidate again, but saw his vote share fall to 1.6%; in the National Assembly elections the party's vote share was reduced to 1.3% and it lost all four seats. Miyanda stood for president again in 2008, but received less than 0.8% of the vote, finishing last amongst the four candidates.

The 2011 general elections saw Miyanda's share of the presidential vote reduced to 0.2%, whilst the party received just 485 votes in the National Assembly elections (0.02%). Miyanda ran for a fifth time in the 2015 presidential elections, finishing eighth in a field of eleven candidates with 0.3% of the vote.

Electoral history

Presidential elections

National Assembly elections

References 

Political parties in Zambia
2001 establishments in Zambia
Political parties established in 2001